The Abhidhammattha-saṅgaha  (The Compendium of Things contained in the Abhidhamma) is a Pali Buddhist instructional manual or compendium of the Abhidhamma of the Theravāda tradition. It was written by the Sri Lankan monk Ācariya Anuruddha some time between the 8th century and the 12th century.

According to Bhikkhu Bodhi, the Abhidhammattha-saṅgaha is one of the most important texts in the Theravāda Abhidhamma tradition and it provides such a "masterly summary" of the Abhidhamma that "has become the standard primer for Abhidhamma studies throughout the Theravāda Buddhist countries of South and Southeast Asia."

Overview 

As noted by Bhikkhu Bodhi, the growth of the Theravāda Abhidhamma into a complex and massive textual tradition, that included both the already large and difficult Abhidhamma Pitaka and numerous commentaries by exegetes like Buddhaghosa (which fills more than 40 volumes in the PTS latin script edition), made it difficult to study for novices. Thus, there arose a need for concise summaries for teaching novices. While there were various texts written for this purpose, the fifty page saṅgaha became the most popular such text because of "its remarkable balance between concision and comprehensiveness."

Ācariya Anuruddha did not introduce any new content or doctrines into the Theravāda Abhidhamma in this text, the work is a compendium or textbook of doctrine. His sources include the Abhidhamma Pitaka and the Visuddhimagga of Buddhaghosa. However, his organization and systematization of Abhidhamma content is unique and innovative. According to Jeffrey Wayne Bass, Anuruddha organized the text with an emphasis on the domain of experience (avacara) in which a given type of consciousness may be encountered. He presents the Abhidharma content into a stratified schema which mirrors Buddhist meditative development (from ordinary mind states to higher states of jhana). Thus, it is also a text which can be seen as a guide to meditative attainment.  

Anuruddha also condensed Abhidhamma teachings by introducing new categories such as "universal" mental factors (sabbacittasadharana), which allowed him to present the material in a much shorter form (in contrast to the Dhammasangani for example). This conciseness made it easy to memorize and transmit, and likely contributed to its popularity.

Outline of chapters
The Abhidhammattha-sangaha consists of the following chapters:

 Chapter I - Compendium of consciousness (Pali: citta-sangaha-vibhāgo). Defines and classifies the 89 and 121 cittas or types of consciousness. 
 Chapter II - Compendium of mental factors (cetasika) or concomitants of consciousness. This chapter enumerates fifty-two mental factors (Pali: cetasikas) or concomitants of consciousness, divided into four classes: universals, occasionals, unwholesome factors, and beautiful factors. It also delves into 89 classes of consciousness, the qualities of matter, rebirth, meditative exercises and relationships between phenomena.
 Chapter III - Miscellaneous, classifies cittas and cetasikas with respect to six categories: root (hetu), feeling (vedana), function (kicca), door (dvara), object (arammana), and base (vatthu). 
 Chapter IV - Analysis of the cognitive process
 Chapter V - Process-Freed
 Chapter VI - Compendium of Matter (rupa), enumerates and classifies material phenomena and explains their modes of origination.
 Chapter VII - Compendium of Categories. This arranges the dhammas outlined in the previous chapters into four broad headings: a compendium of defilements; a compendium of mixed categories; a compendium of the requisites for enlightenment; a compendium of the whole. 
 Chapter VIII - Compendium Of Relations or Conditionality. It analyzes the relationships between dhammas in terms of dependent origination as well as the 24 conditional relations outlined in the Patthana.
 Chapter IX - Compendium of meditation subjects, drawing on the Visuddhimagga, deals with the forty subjects of meditation and the stages of progress.

Commentaries
Because of its short length, this text has been difficult to understand, and therefore various commentaries have been written on it:

Abhidhammattha-sangaha-Tika, also known as the Porana-Tika, "the Old Commentary." A 12th century Sri Lankan commentary by an elder named Acariya Navavimalabuddhi.
Abhidhammattha-vibhavini-Tika, written by Acariya Sumangalasami, 12th century. The most famous and widely used commentary.
Ledi Sayadaw's (1846-1923) Paramattha-dipani-tika, which criticizes the Vibhavini-tika on 325 points and aroused much debate.
Ankura-Tika, by Vimala Sayadaw, defends the opinions of the Vibhavini against Ledi Sayadaw's criticisms.
Navanita-Tika, by the Indian scholar Dhammananda Kosambi, 1933. Titled "The Butter Commentary," because it explains the Sangaha in a smooth and simple manner, avoiding philosophical controversy.
"A Comprehensive Manual of Abhidhamma" by Narada Thera, Bhikkhu Bodhi and U Rewata Dhamma includes an English language introduction and explanatory commentary as well as numerous tables by U Silananda. It draws from both the Vibhavini-Tika and the Paramattha-dipani-tika, focusing on their convergences and complementary contributions instead of their conflicting points. It also draws from the Visuddhimagga.

Translations
The Abhidhammatthasangaha was first translated into English by Shwe Zan Aung (between 1895 and 1905), and this was revised and edited by Mrs. C.A.F Rhys Davids and first printed in 1910.

The Sangaha was also translated into English by Narada Maha Thera, with explanatory notes. The American monk Bhikkhu Bodhi released an updated version with the title "A comprehensive manual of Abhidhamma", with explanations of each section by Ven. U Rewata Dhamma and numerous charts and tables provided by Ven. U Silananada. A supplement to this text is 'Process of Consciousness and Matter by Ven. Dr. Rewata Dhamma'.

Another translation of the Sangaha by Rupert Gethin and RP Wijeratne includes the Abhidhammattha-vibhavini commentary by Sumangala and was published in 2002 by the Pali Text Society.

Notes

Sources
 A Comprehensive Manual of Abhidhamma by Bhikkhu Bodhi
 ABHIDHAMMATTHA - SANGAHA, translated by Nārada Thera, Vājirārāma, Colombo
 A Manual of Abhidhamma: Abhidhammattha Sangaha of Bhadanta Anuruddhācariya

Pali Buddhist texts
11th-century books
Abhidharma
Theravada Buddhist texts